Dolyhir  is a small settlement in Powys, Wales.

Dolyhir railway station is located next to the former quarry, which contains notable fossils.

References

External links 
Photos of Dolyhir and surrounding area on geograph

Villages in Powys